Yıldızlı (literally "with stars" in Turkish) may refer to the following places in Turkey:

 Yıldızlı, Arhavi, a village in the district of Arhavi, Artvin Province
 Yıldızlı, Baskil
 Yıldızlı, Kemaliye
 Yıldızlı, Kozluk, a village in the district of Kozluk, Batman Province
 Yıldızlı, Polatlı, a village in the district of Polatlı, Ankara Province

See also
 Yıldız (disambiguation)